Nokas is a 2010 Norwegian heist film directed by Erik Skjoldbjærg. The film portrays the real life NOKAS robbery that took place in Stavanger, Norway in 2004.

In 2011, the film was screened at the Norwegian International Film Festival, where Skjoldbjærg won the award for best director and screenwriter Christopher Grøndahl won the award for best original screenplay.

Cast
Tov Sletta as David Toska
Frode Winther Gunnes as Kjell Alrich Schumann
Morten Håland as Erik Håland
Geir Høyseth as Erling Havnå
Morten Larsen as Arne Sigve Klungland
Marit Synnøve Berg as Beate
Jeton Jajovski as Jusuf Hani
André Eriksen as Thomas Thendrup
Lirik Sahiti as Ikmet Kodzadziku
Thomas Berhane as Metkel Betew
Lars Morten Skaiaa as Johnny Thendrup

References

External links

2010 films
Films directed by Erik Skjoldbjærg
2010s heist films
Norwegian crime films
2010s Norwegian-language films
Crime films based on actual events